The La Tuque generating station is a hydroelectric power plant, located on the Saint-Maurice River, at the height of the city of La Tuque, in the province of Quebec, in Canada. This power plant is the property of Hydro-Québec. It is sixth of eleven hydroelectric dams on the river from the mouth.

Geography 
The mouth of the Bostonnais River flows into this great reservoir of Saint-Maurice River whose waters are retained by the dam. The next dam downstream on this river is the Grand-Mère's dam. The distance between these two dams offer a wide range of significant water for recreational boating.

External links 
 Dam La Tuque
 Central La Tuque

Dams completed in 1940
Energy infrastructure completed in 1940
Dams in Quebec
La Tuque, Quebec
Buildings and structures in Mauricie
Run-of-the-river power stations